João Guilherme Estevão da Silva or simply Choco (born 4 January 1990, in Paranaguá), is a Brazilian football striker. He plays for CRAC.

Made professional debut with Atlético-PR in 1-1 home draw against Atlético Mineiro in Campeonato Brasileiro Série A on 25 May 2009.

References

External links
 Soccerway profile
  Zerozero.pt

1990 births
Living people
Brazilian footballers
Club Athletico Paranaense players
Marília Atlético Clube players
Brazilian expatriate footballers
Expatriate footballers in Georgia (country)
People from Paranaguá
Association football forwards
Sportspeople from Paraná (state)